The East Fork Salmon River is a  tributary of the Salmon River, flowing through Custer County, Idaho in the United States. The East Fork Salmon River is formed at the confluence of the West Fork East Fork Salmon River and the South Fork East Fork Salmon River between the Boulder and White Cloud mountains in Sawtooth National Recreation Area.

See also
List of rivers of Idaho

References

Rivers of Idaho
Tributaries of the Salmon River (Idaho)
Rivers of Custer County, Idaho